Lars Blixt (born 8 October 1976) is a retired Norwegian football defender.

Hailing from Trysil, he played for local teams Trysilgutten IL and Nybergsund until being scouted by Skjetten. He signed for them in 1999 to play 1. divisjon football.

Returning to Nybergsund in 2000, he now played so well that Norway's leading team Rosenborg BK signed him. After 15 league games and 11 cup games in Rosenborg, he was loaned out to Sogndal in late 2004—Rosenborg had previously bought Sogndal's Robbie Russell to cover for the soon-to-be-gone Blixt. After the 2004 season Blixt was released.

He stayed on the first tier with Fredrikstad FK, even scoring the only goal in an away match against Rosenborg in April 2005, but after a lacklustre first half of the 2006 season he was released.

References

1976 births
Living people
People from Trysil
Norwegian footballers
Nybergsund IL players
Skjetten SK players
Rosenborg BK players
Sogndal Fotball players
Fredrikstad FK players
Norwegian First Division players
Eliteserien players
Association football defenders
Sportspeople from Innlandet